Kandovan (also Romanized as Kandovān) is a village in Kandovan Rural District, Kandovan District, Meyaneh County, East Azerbaijan Province, Iran. As of the 2006 census, its population was 424, in 103 families.

References 

Populated places in Meyaneh County